Callidrepana amaura is a moth in the family Drepanidae first described by Warren in 1901. It is found in Nigeria.

The moth's wingspan is about 20 mm. Its forewings are brownish ochreous, darker brownish towards the hindmargin, with all the veins paler. There is a silvery-scaled streak along the costa from the base, becoming subcostal in the outer half of the wing and there is a diffuse brown shade from the base through the cell towards the apex, with a line of silvery scales along its middle. There is also a large brown mulberry-shaped discocellular blotch with some lustrous scales upon it and a smaller dark brown blotch between it and the apex, as well as traces of a dull brown lustrous-edged inner line at one-third, more distinct towards the inner margin. There is a denticulated lustrous line, marked with dark leaden-tinged spots on the veins, from the costa before the apex to the anal angle, preceded by a brown shade and followed by a brown suffusion. The hindwings are paler, with the submarginal lustrous line and brown shades as in the forewings, but not reaching the costa. There are traces of a central brown shade from the inner margin.

References

Endemic fauna of Nigeria
Moths described in 1901
Drepaninae